Bobby Black may refer to:

 Bobby Black (Scottish footballer) (c. 1927–2012), Scottish footballer
 Bobby Black (footballer, born 1915) (1915–1979), English footballer
 Bobby Black (journalist) (born 1973), senior editor of High Times magazine
 Bobby Black (rugby union) (1893–1916), New Zealand rugby union player

See also
 Robert Black (disambiguation)